Thomas Angus Moffat (15 May 1948 – 11 February 2015) was a Scottish professional footballer who played as a right winger. Active in England, Scotland, the United States and Canada between 1964 and 1983, Moffat made nearly 200 career league appearances.

Playing career
Born in Lanarkshire, Scotland, Moffat played in the United Kingdom for Southampton, Motherwell, Falkirk and Dumbarton.

He joined Southampton as an amateur in May 1964. While playing for Motherwell he was the first player in Scottish football to score a goal after coming on as a substitute.

He also played in the North American Soccer League for the Detroit Cougars, the Toronto Metros, the Detroit Express and the Washington Diplomats, and in the American Soccer League for the Detroit Express. In 1976, he played in Canada in the National Soccer League with Windsor Stars for two seasons.

Later career
After retiring as a player, Moffatt settled in Windsor, Ontario with his family.

In the 1980s, Moffatt coached AC Roma, an amateur team in Windsor, Ontario. In 1985, he was the head coach for the Windsor Wheels in the National Soccer League. In his debut season he led Windsor to the NSL Championship final, but were defeated by Toronto Italia. He returned to coach Windsor for the 1986 season. In August 1986, Windsor dismissed him from his position. In 1989, Moffatt, along with Brian Tinnion, founded the Detroit Rockers. He died in Canada on 11 February 2015.

References

1948 births
2015 deaths
Scottish footballers
Southampton F.C. players
Motherwell F.C. players
Detroit Cougars (soccer) players
Falkirk F.C. players
Dumbarton F.C. players
Toronto Blizzard (1971–1984) players
Detroit Express players
Detroit Express (1981–1983) players
Washington Diplomats (NASL) players
Scottish Football League players
North American Soccer League (1968–1984) players
North American Soccer League (1968–1984) indoor players
American Soccer League (1933–1983) players
Association football wingers
Scottish expatriate footballers
Scottish expatriate sportspeople in the United States
Expatriate soccer players in the United States
Scottish expatriate sportspeople in Canada
Expatriate soccer players in Canada
Canadian National Soccer League coaches
Canadian National Soccer League players